The Fordyce and Princeton Railroad Company  is a short-line railroad headquartered in Crossett, Arkansas.

F&P operates  of line from Fordyce, Arkansas (where it interchanges with Union Pacific), to an interchange with Arkansas, Louisiana and Mississippi Railroad at Crossett.

F&P traffic generally consists of lumber and paper products.

F&P incorporated on February 25, 1890, as a  line between Fordyce and Toan, Arkansas.  The railroad expanded, then downsized to a mere  of switching track near Fordyce.  After the liquidation of Chicago, Rock Island and Pacific Railroad, F&P acquired the line between Fordyce and Crossett, via Banks, Craney, Hermitage, Ingalls, Vick, Broad, Emery, and Whitlow.

F&P was owned by Georgia Pacific from 1963 until March 2004, when it was sold to Genesee and Wyoming.

External links

 Link to Union Pacific Website with F&P Details
 Fordyce and Princeton Railroad official webpage - Genesee and Wyoming website

Arkansas railroads
Railway companies established in 1890
Switching and terminal railroads
Genesee & Wyoming